With Love From The Boys is the second studio album by Dutch rock and roll band Claw Boys Claw and their first release on a major label. Their debut album, Shocking Shades of Claw Boys Claw, self-released on Hipcat, had been well received in the Dutch press, and in 1984 and 1985 they cemented their reputation as one of the country's best live acts, which was partly documented on a live EP, Live!, recorded in 1984 and released in 1985 also on Hipcat. Their live reputation culminated in a memorable show at Pinkpop 1986, and these successes had led Polydor to offer the band a long-term contract. The band had undergone one personnel change: founding member Allard Jolles left to focus on his other band, L'Attentat; he was replaced by Marius Schrader.

With Love From The Boys was produced by Vic Maile; critics did note that the album sounded a bit flat, and the compositions were also criticized as somewhat weak. Released on vinyl, the album has never been re-released.

Track listing

The Compact Cassette featured three extra tracks, recorded at Pinkpop 1986: "Suzie McKenna," "Shake It On The Rocks," and "Venus."

Personnel
John Cameron - guitar
Pete TeBos - vocals
Bobbie Rossini - bass
Marius Schrader - drums

References

See also
Claw Boys Claw discography

1986 albums
Claw Boys Claw albums
Albums produced by Vic Maile
Polydor Records albums